Evangelical Lutheran Church of Saddle River and Ramapough Building (now known as Zion Evangelical Lutheran Church of Saddle River NJ) is a historic church at 96 E. Allendale Road in Saddle River, Bergen County, New Jersey, United States.

It was built in 1821 and added to the National Register of Historic Places in 1986.

See also 
 National Register of Historic Places listings in Bergen County, New Jersey

References

External links
 View of Evangelical Lutheran Church of Saddle River and Ramapough Building via Google Street View

Churches on the National Register of Historic Places in New Jersey
Federal architecture in New Jersey
Churches completed in 1821
19th-century Lutheran churches in the United States
Churches in Bergen County, New Jersey
Lutheran churches in New Jersey
National Register of Historic Places in Bergen County, New Jersey
Saddle River, New Jersey
New Jersey Register of Historic Places